Vaa Magale Vaa is a 1994 Tamil-language thriller film directed by Visu. The film stars Visu, Khushbu, Rekha and Veera Pandiyan, with Delhi Ganesh, Charle, Thyagu, T. P. Gajendran and T. S. Balachander playing supporting roles. Based on the play Mounam Kalaikirathu by Sornavel, it was released on 13 May 1994.

Plot 

Uma, a lawyer, is the daughter of the retired judge Viswanathan. He treasures her a lot and treats his maids as his friends. Uma reveals that she fell in love at first sight with Pandiyan during college. Pandiyan is now a police officer but he fears his very strict father Sankar Raman. Both families accept for their wedding.

Uma sees a man behind the bar when she visits her lover at the police station one day. Although she believes he is innocent, Pandiyan won't release him because he is the prime suspect in a murder. Raman, a hapless TV mechanic, is charged. Uma becomes his lawyer and makes him released on bail. Uma begins her investigation, soon she starts to suspect her father Viswanathan's conduct first and later his morality. What transpires next forms the rest of the story.

Cast 

Visu as Viswanathan
Khushbu as Uma
Rekha as Kalyani
Veera Pandiyan as Pandiyan
Delhi Ganesh as Mahadeva Iyer
Charle as Raman
Thyagu as Amarnath
T. P. Gajendran as Muthu
T. S. Balachander as Sankar Raman
Kullamani as Kullan
Manager Cheena
Ambi as Shankar Raman
P. R. Varalakshmi as Saraswathi
Kavithasri
Shanmugasundari as Kullan's mother
Sumathisri as Anjala
Kovai Senthil
Pandiyan in a guest appearance
Vennira Aadai Moorthy as Bhujanga Rao (guest appearance)
Vivek in a guest appearance

Production 
Vaa Magale Vaa was adapted from the play Mounam Kalaikirathu by Karaikudi Sornavel.

Soundtrack 
The music was composed by Deva, with lyrics written by Muthulingam.

References

External links 
 

1990s Tamil-language films
1994 films
Films directed by Visu
Films scored by Deva (composer)
Films with screenplays by Visu
Indian courtroom films
Indian films based on plays
Indian legal films
Indian thriller films